The women's long jump F42 event at the 2008 Summer Paralympics took place at the Beijing National Stadium at 18:00 on 8 September.
There was a single round of competition, and as there were  only 8 competitors they each had 6 jumps.
The competition was won by Christine Wolf, representing .

Results

 
WR = World Record. SB = Seasonal Best.

References

Athletics at the 2008 Summer Paralympics
2008 in women's athletics